Saint Anna German High School, usually known as Annenschule, was a school in Saint Petersburg, Russia founded in 1736 for children of the German population of the city. In 1918, Annenschule became Soviet work school №11, and later school №203. Its alumni included well known people -  ethnologist Nicholai Miklukho-Maklai, jeweler Peter Fabergé, philologist Faddei Zielinski, teacher and physician Peter Lesgaft, poet and Nobel Prize laureate Joseph Brodsky, actress Elena Granovsky, writer Igor Yefimov, and chess world championship pretendent Victor Korchnoi. In 1975 the famous city specialized high school №239 moved into the building.

History
In 1711, a foundry was established on the left bank of Neva River in Saint Petersburg in order to equip the Russian Army for the Great Northern War. Its operation required skilled employees. Therefore, Peter the Great invited foreign professionals from Switzerland, Holland and Germany. Many of them came together with their families, and they settled together by nationality in settlements called sloboda. A German sloboda was located in the area close to today's Liteyny Prospekt, and had a strong Lutheran community. In 1720–1722, a wooden Lutheran church was built on the edge of the sloboda. Its first pastor, Iogan Leonard Shatner, started to teach German to the children. Soon these classes became very popular, and Shatner started a campaign to build a dedicated building for the school. With the help of Jacob Bruce the school was built, and on January 3, 1736, it was formally open. That was the beginning of Annenschule.

In 1734–1740, the new temple was built in place of the old one. 1740 was the year in which Empress Anna Ioanovna died and bequeathed a large sum of money for building of the new temple. Therefore, it was decided that the church would have the name of Saint Anna. The school also received the same name. From that time it was called "School of St. Anna", Annenschule in German.

In 1775–1779, architect Yury Felten (best known for his work on the iron-cast grille of the Summer Garden) built the stone Church of Saint Anna, which survived until recently. In 1781, local businessman Joachim Gottfried Kestner donated money to build a stone building for the school as well.

By late 1860, Annenschule had grown to hundreds of students. In 1867, there were 537 boys and 307 girls. There was a lack of classrooms to accommodate such numbers, so in 1868 the new building was built.

The school reached its highest point during the period from 1884–1910, when it was under the directorship of Joseph König. During these 26 years the school was constantly expanding: from 1153 students in 1884 to 1733 in 1908. In 1889, the school alumni collected money to build a gym. The gym won a gold medal in All-Russian Health Fair in 1893 as unique in Europe at that time. The gym featured an original design, with its roof shaped as an arc with windows in it. The gym is still used for physical education lessons today.

At the beginning of the 20th century, Annenschule consisted of boys' and girls' gymnasiums, realschule, an elementary school and an orphan house. The new expansion was called for again. In 1905-1906 a new building was built on the other side of the Saint Anna Church.

After the October Revolution, on October 18, 1918, Saint Anna School was nationalized, and by decree of Sovnarkom it was included in the government education structure. The Soviet work school was established on the base of the school. Teaching in German was first reduced, and later eliminated. In 1934 the school was split, with school №32 (later №203) occupying the newer building, and school №11 (later school №189) staying in the old building. In 1975 the city's specialized high school №239 with advanced programs in physics and mathematics moved into the old building.

Famous alumni
 Nicholai Miklukho-Maklai
 Peter Carl Fabergé
 Tadeusz Stefan Zieliński
 Vladimir Propp
 Vasily Vasilievich Struve
 Peter Lesgaft
 Sergey Martinson
 Alexander Beggrov
 Bruno Freindlich
 Joseph Brodsky
 Elena Granovsky
 Igor Yefimov
 Victor Korchnoi
 Evgeny Kliachkin
 Eleonore Kalkowska
 August Morawitz

References
Igor Arkhangelsky. Annenschule through three centuries. 
 History of lyceum №239
Annenschule on Sankt Petersburg encyclopedia

1736 establishments in the Russian Empire
Educational institutions established in 1736
Schools in Saint Petersburg
Cultural heritage monuments in Saint Petersburg